Sydney Hodgson (died 10 December 1591) was an English Roman Catholic lawyer. He is a Catholic martyr, beatified in 1929.

Life

He was a Catholic convert. In 1591, while Father Edmund Gennings was saying Mass at the house of Swithin Wells in London, the pursuivant Topcliffe and his assistants broke into the house just at the moment of consecration. On this account alone, their entrance into the room was obstructed by some of the male members of the congregation, including Sydney Hodgson, until the conclusion of the Mass; these gentlemen then surrendered themselves.

Hodgson and the others were brought to trial on 4 December 1591, the charge against him being merely that of receiving and relieving priests, and of being reconciled to the Church of Rome. He was offered his life if he would give some sort of a promise of occasional conformity to the Established Church. He was condemned and executed at Tyburn on 10 December.

References

Attribution
 The entry cites:
Joseph Gillow, Bibl. Dict. Eng. Cath. s. v.; 
Richard Challoner, Memoirs (Edinburgh, 1878), I, 180, 190; 
Charles Dodd & M. A. Tierney, Church History, II, 260; 
John Morris, Troubles, 3rd series.

1591 deaths
Converts to Roman Catholicism
English beatified people
16th-century venerated Christians
Year of birth unknown
People executed under Elizabeth I
Executed English people
One Hundred and Seven Martyrs of England and Wales